Jean-Claude Annoux (15 May 1939 – 2 October 2004) was a French author/composer/singer. He was known for his hit song "Aux jeunes loups" in 1965

Biography
He was classically trained as a violinist and written songs for  Marcel Amont and Philippe Clay.

Songs
(Selective)
"Les Touristes"
"A la première Sophie"
"Aux jeunes loups"
"C'est formidable"
"Je ne sais pas chanter les chansons d'amour"
"Le jour de notre amour"
"Les amants"
"Plus heureux que le roi"
"Vive la mariée"
"Je suis contre"
"Moi, ma fleur"
"La messe de Pâques"
"Isabelle"
"à Bidou"
"Gare au Show biz" 
"Brest"
"Les Mères"
"Un Câlin"

Books
1993: Gare au Show biz

References 

1939 births
2004 deaths
People from Beauvais
French male composers
Place of birth missing
20th-century French male singers